The Johns Hopkins University SAIS Europe in Bologna, Italy, is the European campus of the Paul H. Nitze School of Advanced International Studies (SAIS), a division of Johns Hopkins University located in Washington, D.C. SAIS Europe offers an interdisciplinary academic program that emphasizes international economics, international relations, languages, and specializations either in functional areas or regional studies.

SAIS Europe was founded in 1955 by C. Grove Haines. In 1961, the school moved to its present location on Via Belmeloro and completed a major renovation of its facilities in 2006.

Overview
SAIS Europe has an enrollment of about 200 students from 35 different countries with a student-faculty ratio of approximately 6 to 1. One of the distinguishing characteristics of the school is its resident faculty complemented by some 40 adjunct professors drawn from top universities, institutes, think tanks, international NGOs, consulting firms, and financial institutions in Europe and beyond. In a typical year, students can choose from more than 60 course offerings. The relatively small size of the student body—numbering just under 200—and the broad international diversity—with over 35 countries represented each year—allow students to develop the ability to communicate across national borders and cultures while fostering a sense of community.

The Director of the SAIS Europe is Michael Plummer, Eni Professor of International Economics.

In Foreign Policy (magazine) polls, SAIS is consistently ranked as a top master's degree program for those pursuing a career in international relations.

In 2022, Johns Hopkins announced that Edinburgh-based investor and alumnus James Anderson and his spouse, Morag Anderson, has donated $100 million to expand the Bologna SAIS campus into a multidisciplinary research hub.

Degree Programs Offered

Master of Arts in International Relations - M.A.: The Master of Arts in International Relations is a two-year program. The first year is in Bologna and the second year at the SAIS Washington DC campus.
Master of Arts in International Affairs - MAIA: This is a two-year course with both years in Bologna. After completing the first year of the MA program,  candidates for the MAIA spend their second year in Bologna where they complete further courses and defend a research thesis.
Master of International Public Policy - MIPP: The MIPP is a one-year degree course held at SAIS Europe aimed at mid-career professionals working in the field of international affairs. Candidates for this degree must complete eight courses at the center.
Diploma in International Studies: The SAIS Europe Diploma is a one-year course provided at the Bologna Center. The diploma also counts as the first year of the MA course.
Joint degree programs: SAIS Europe also agreements with two other universities to offer joint degree programs: an MAIA/MAIS (with the Diplomatic Academy of Vienna in Vienna) and an MAIA-Laurea Magistrale with the University of Bologna
Junior Year Abroad - Johns Hopkins University - Baltimore: select students who are pursuing the International Relations Studies can apply to spend their junior year at SAIS Europe - Bologna

Research Institutions and Publications 

 The Center for Constitutional Studies and Democratic Development: The CCSDD is a joint project of the Bologna Center and the University of Bologna Faculty of Law. It conducts research on countries undergoing a transition to democracy and runs educational courses in these countries to provide training and capacity building for the growth of democratic institutions.
The SAIS Europe Journal of Global Affairs: The SAIS Europe Journal of International Affairs is a scholarly journal run by the students of SAIS Europe, published by the center yearly since 1997. Its stated purpose is to provide, 'a forum for the discussion and dissemination of ideas about current issues in the field of international relations to a broad audience concerned with foreign relations.'
The Italian Foreign Policy Dialogue: The Italian Foreign Policy Dialogue is a forum for Italian academics, foreign affairs professionals and think-tanks. It aims to improve communication between these groups and improve the effectiveness of Italian foreign policy.

References 

Johns Hopkins University
Schools of international relations
Education in Bologna
Universities in Italy
Educational institutions established in 1955
1955 establishments in Italy